Peñaranda may refer to:

Peñaranda, Nueva Ecija
Peñaranda (surname)